Elinaldo da Silva Lira, known as Lino (born 1 November 1971) is a retired Brazilian football midfielder.

References

1971 births
Living people
Brazilian footballers
S.C. Salgueiros players
Clube de Regatas Brasil players
Centro Sportivo Alagoano players
Sport Club Corinthians Alagoano players
Associação Cultural Esporte Clube Baraúnas players
Association football midfielders
Primeira Liga players
Brazilian expatriate footballers
Expatriate footballers in Portugal
Brazilian expatriate sportspeople in Portugal
People from Maceió
Sportspeople from Alagoas